Pris-Mag is an Italian company which produces hook loaders, dump trucks, quick change systems and specialty equipment for industrial vehicles.

History 
The company was founded by Alessandro Sala in 1975 in the small industrial town of Vimercate,  from Milan. It was the first company in Europe that produced hook loaders.

In 1997 Pris-mag increased its production and moved to Cambiago.

Pris-Mag has a staff of more than 120 employees.

References

External links

Manufacturing companies based in Milan
Manufacturing companies established in 1975
1975 establishments in Italy
Vimercate